Jarlan Junior Barrera Escalona (born 16 September 1995) is a Colombian professional footballer who plays as an attacking midfielder for Atlético Nacional.

Club career
Born in Santa Marta, Barrera joined Atlético Junior's youth setup in 2013, from La Equidad. He made his first team debut on 7 March 2013, coming on as a second-half substitute for Edwin Cardona in a 6–0 home routing of Valledupar, for the year's Copa Colombia.

Regularly used in the cup matches, Barrera was only promoted to the main squad midway through the 2014 campaign. He made his Categoría Primera A debut on 24 August of that year, replacing Jorge Ortega in a 1–0 away loss against Independiente Medellín.

Barrera scored his first senior goals on 27 August 2014, netting a brace in a 2–0 away defeat of Uniautónoma, for the season's national cup. His first league goal came eight days later, as he scored his team's third in a 4–3 home win against Atlético Huila.

Barrera quickly established himself as a starter for the club in the following years, winning two national cups during the process. On 12 December 2018, in the second leg of the 2018 Copa Sudamericana Finals, he missed a penalty in the stoppage time which would have given his side a 2–1 lead over Athletico Paranaense; Junior lost the tournament in the shoot-outs, with Barrera being substituted off shortly after his missed penalty.

Barrera joined Tigres UANL on 1 January 2019, but only eight days later, he was loaned out to Rosario Central in Argentina. The deal cost Rosario $200.000 and was without an option to buy.

International career
After representing Colombia at under-20 level, Barrera was called up by the full side's manager José Pekerman for a training squad in February 2016. He appeared in two matches with the under-23 team, but was cut out from Carlos Restrepo's final 19-man list ahead of the 2016 Summer Olympics.

Personal life
Barrera is a relative of former footballer Carlos Valderrama.

Career statistics

Honours

Club
Atlético Junior
 Copa Colombia: 2015, 2017
 Categoría Primera A: 2018 Finalización

References

External links

1995 births
Living people
People from Santa Marta
Colombian footballers
Colombian expatriate footballers
Association football midfielders
Categoría Primera A players
Atlético Junior footballers
Tigres UANL footballers
Rosario Central footballers
Atlético Nacional footballers
Liga MX players
Argentine Primera División players
Colombian expatriate sportspeople in Argentina
Expatriate footballers in Argentina
2015 South American Youth Football Championship players
Colombia youth international footballers
Colombia under-20 international footballers
Sportspeople from Magdalena Department